The 2021–22 season was the 107th season of the Isthmian League, which is an English football competition featuring semi-professional and amateur clubs from London, East and South East England. The league operates four divisions, the Premier Division at Step 3 and three divisions, North, South Central and South East at Step 4 of the National League System. This was the fourth season since the former South Division was subdivided into the South Central and South East divisions. The league was also known as the Pitching In League under a sponsorship deal with Entain, formerly GVC Holdings.

The allocations for Step 4 this season were announced by The Football Association (FA) on 17 May 2021. Numerous changes were made to the constitutions of the level 8 divisions within the Isthmian League.

The scheduled restructuring of the non-League system took place for the 2021–22 season and a new division was added to the Northern Premier League at Step 4 for 2021–22, which resulted in some reallocations into or out of, and promotions to, the Isthmian League's Step 4 divisions.

Premier Division
The Premier Division comprised the same set of 22 teams which competed in the aborted competition the previous season.

League table

Top scorers

Play-offs

Semi-finals

Final

Results table

Stadiums and locations

North Division

North Division consisted of 20 clubs: 17 clubs from the previous season, and three new clubs:
Barking, transferred from the South Central Division
Hashtag United, promoted from the Essex Senior League
Stowmarket Town, promoted from Eastern Counties League

League table

Top scorers

Play-offs

Semi-finals

Final

Inter-step play-off

Results table

Stadiums and locations

South Central Division

After Whyteleafe resigned from the league after losing its ground and folded, South Central Division consisted of 19 clubs: 14 clubs from the previous season, and five new clubs:
Basingstoke Town, transferred from the Southern League
Binfield, promoted from the Hellenic League
Guernsey, transferred from the South East Division returning to the league after one season of absence
Sutton Common Rovers, promoted from the Combined Counties League
Thatcham Town, transferred from the Southern League

League table

Top scorers

Play-offs

Semi-finals

Final

Inter-step play-off

Results table

Stadiums and locations

South East Division

South East Division consisted of 20 clubs: 18 clubs from the previous season, and two new clubs:
Corinthian (Kent), promoted from the Southern Counties East League
Lancing, promoted from the Southern Combination League

League table

Top scorers

Play-offs

Semi-finals

Final

Inter-step play-off

Results table

Stadiums and locations

Relegation reprieves

Step 3
Seven clubs at Step 3, all four fourth-from-bottom teams and those placed third-from-bottom that were the top three on a points per game (PPG) basis, were reprieved from relegation. The remaining team was relegated to Step 4.

The final points-per-game ranking of the third-from-bottom placed teams in Step 3 divisions was as follows:

Source:

Step 4
Ten of the 16 clubs at Step 4, all eight fourth-from-bottom teams and two clubs placed third-from-bottom, one at the top and the other in third place on a points per game (PPG) basis, were reprieved from contesting relegation play-offs. The FA granted third-placed Sheffield a reprieve after demoting Yorkshire Amateur for non-compliance with Step 4 ground grading requirements. The remaining six teams contested one-off matches with sixrunners-up from Step 5 that had the fewest PPG at the end of the 2021–22 season. Three winners of their matches stayed at Step 4 for the 2022–23 season, while three others lost theirs and were relegated to Step 5.

The final points-per-game ranking of the 3rd-from-bottom-placed teams in Step 4 divisions was also as follows:

Source:

League Cup

The 2021–22 Velocity Trophy (formerly the Isthmian League Cup) was the 48th season of the Alan Turvey Trophy, the cup competition of the whole Isthmian League. 60 of the 82 teams in the Isthmian League participated this season, with the other 22 opting not to participate.

Enfield Town were the defending champions, having beaten AFC Hornchurch in the 2018–19 season—the most recent season in which the competition was fully completed following the abandonment of the 2019–20 competition due to the COVID-19 pandemic. The competition was not held during the 2020–21 season.

This season's competition reverted to a straight knock out format. If a game finished level after 90 minutes, the match went straight to penalties—there was no extra time. Clubs were allowed to name and use 5 substitutes per match.

Calendar

First round
Twenty-four clubs participated in the first round, while thirty-six clubs received a bye to the second round

Second round
The twelve clubs who made it through the first round were joined in the draw by twenty clubs who got a bye through the previous round, making thirty-two clubs.

Third round
All Premier Division sides participating in the competition received a bye to the third round. They joined the sixteen clubs that advanced past the Second round.

Fourth round

Quarter-finals

Semi-finals

Final

See also
Isthmian League
2021–22 Northern Premier League
2021–22 Southern Football League

References

External links
Official website

2021-22
7
Eng